Sergey Andreyevich Volkov (born 10 May 1995) is a Russian football player who plays for FC Akron Tolyatti.

Club career
He made his debut in the Russian Football National League for FC Akron Tolyatti on 8 August 2020 in a game against FC Shinnik Yaroslavl.

References

External links
 
 Profile by Russian Football National League
 

1995 births
Sportspeople from Tolyatti
Living people
Russian footballers
Association football goalkeepers
FC Lada-Tolyatti players
FC Akron Tolyatti players
Russian First League players
Russian Second League players